Scoliacma fasciata is a moth in the family Erebidae. It was described by Per Olof Christopher Aurivillius in 1920. It is found in Australia, where it has been recorded from Queensland.

References

Arctiidae genus list at Butterflies and Moths of the World of the Natural History Museum

Moths described in 1920
Lithosiina